Francisco Catalão Rebelo Andrade (born August 6, 1980 in Rio de Janeiro, Brazil) is a Portuguese sailor. He competed at the 2008 and 2012 Summer Olympics in the 49er class, finishing in 11th and 8th place respectively.

References

External links
 
 

1980 births
Living people
Portuguese male sailors (sport)
Olympic sailors of Portugal
Sailors at the 2008 Summer Olympics – 49er
Sailors at the 2012 Summer Olympics – 49er

Portuguese people of Brazilian descent